The Nagoya Tech Silverbacks football program represents the Nagoya Institute of Technology in college football. They are members of the Tokai Collegiate American Football Association.

References

External links
 

American football in Japan